Pest Control is an exclusive to audio Doctor Who story, produced as part of BBC Books' New Series Adventures line, and the first entry in the series to be produced. Written by author Peter Anghelides and read by series star David Tennant, it is also the first non-televised Doctor Who adventure to feature the companion Donna Noble (the first standard printed books featuring her were released in autumn 2008).  Pest Control was released on CD on 8 May 2008 and is also available for download.

The story is accompanied by an original soundtrack and sound effects created by Simon Hunt.

Plot
The Doctor and Donna land on the distant planet of Rescension and find themselves caught in a war between humans and the centaur-like Aquabi. When a far greater threat emerges, the Doctor must convince the two sides to work together before they are all wiped out.

Featuring 
 Tenth Doctor
 Donna Noble

References

Audiobooks based on Doctor Who
Tenth Doctor audio plays
2008 audio plays